Charles A. O. McClellan (May 25, 1835 – January 31, 1898) was an American banker, lawyer, and jurist who served four terms as a U.S. Representative from Indiana from 1889 to 1893.

Biography
Born in Ashland, Ohio, McClellan moved to Auburn, Indiana, in 1856.
He attended the public schools.
He studied law in Auburn and Waterloo, Indiana.
He was admitted to the bar in 1863 and commenced practice in Waterloo.

He became engaged in banking in 1868.

He was appointed judge of the Fortieth Judicial Circuit of Indiana by Governor Williams in 1879, and served for two years.

Congress 
McClellan was elected as a Democrat to the Fifty-first and Fifty-second Congresses (March 4, 1889 – March 3, 1893).
He served as chairman of the Committee on Expenditures in the Department of the Navy (Fifty-second Congress).
He was not a candidate for renomination in 1892.

Later career and death 
He again engaged in banking and the practice of law.
He died in Auburn, Indiana, January 31, 1898.
He was interred in Waterloo Cemetery, Waterloo, Indiana.

References

1835 births
1898 deaths
People from Auburn, Indiana
People from Ashland, Ohio
People from DeKalb County, Indiana
Indiana state court judges
Democratic Party members of the United States House of Representatives from Indiana
19th-century American politicians
19th-century American judges
Burials in Indiana